Arthur "Harpo" Marx (born Adolph Marx; November 23, 1888 – September 28, 1964) was an American comedian, actor, mime artist, and harpist, and the second-oldest of the Marx Brothers. In contrast to the mainly verbal comedy of his brothers Groucho and Chico, Harpo's comic style was visual, being an example of vaudeville, clown and pantomime traditions. He wore a curly reddish blond wig and was silent in all his movie appearances, instead blowing a horn or whistling to communicate. Marx frequently employed props such as a horn cane constructed from a lead pipe, tape, and a bulbhorn.

Early life 
Harpo was born on November 23, 1888, in Manhattan, New York City. He grew up in a neighborhood now known as Carnegie Hill (known at the time as Yorkville) on the Upper East Side of Manhattan, on East 93rd Street off Lexington Avenue. The turn-of-the-century tenement that Harpo later called "the first real home I can remember" was situated in a neighborhood populated with European immigrants, mostly artisans. The neighborhood hosted many historic homes and other buildings, such as the William Goadby Loew House (now the Spence School), the Congregation Shaare Zedek, and the Virginia Graham Fair Vanderbilt house.

His parents were Sam Marx (known by his nickname "Frenchie"/"Frenchy") and his wife, Minnie Schoenberg Marx, sister of comedian and Vaudeville performer Al Shean. Marx's family was Jewish. His mother was from East Frisia, Germany, and his father, a tailor, was from Alsace, which was part of the Second French Empire at the time the elder Marx was born and for most of his childhood.

Harpo received little formal education and dropped out of New York Public School 86 at age eight (mainly due to bullying) during his second attempt to pass the second grade. He began to work, gaining employment in numerous odd jobs alongside his older brother Chico to contribute to the family income, including selling newspapers, working in a butcher shop, and as an office errand boy.

Career

On stage 

In January 1910, Harpo joined two of his younger brothers, Julius (later "Groucho") and Milton (later "Gummo"), to form "The Three Nightingales", which would later be renamed "The Marx Brothers". Multiple unverified stories attempt to explain Harpo's evolution as the "silent" character in the brothers' act. In his memoir, Groucho wrote that Harpo simply wasn't very good at memorizing dialogue, and thus was ideal to portray the archetypal Vaudeville role of the "dunce who couldn't speak."

Differing stories exist regarding the origin of the Harpo stage name.  The first suggests the pseudonym originated during a card game at the Orpheum Theatre in Galesburg, Illinois. In this version of the story, Marx was referred to by Art Fisher, the dealer that night, as "Harpo" because he played harp.  However, this version of events is disputed, at least partially because the Orpheum Theatre was not constructed until late 1916, whereas Harpo later remembered acquiring the name in 1914.  There is no dispute that Fisher coined the name, but some sources give an earlier date for its origin and suggest the game may have instead taken place at the Galesburg Auditorium Theatre or the same town's Gaiety Theatre. Harpo learned how to hold the harp by emulating a harp-playing angel in a picture he saw in a five-and-dime. No one in town knew how to play the harp, so Harpo tuned it the best he could, starting with one basic note and tuning it from there. He began learning to play the instrument without lessons. Three years later, he found out he had tuned it incorrectly, but that his method placed much less tension on the strings. Despite Harpo's musical talent, he never learned to read or write music.  Although he paid top musicians handsome fees to teach him "proper" harp-playing technique, he maintained his unique style his entire life (his "teachers," fascinated by his technique, spent their sessions watching and listening as Marx performed). The major exception was Mildred Dilling, the professional harpist who finally taught Harpo proper harp technique and collaborated with him regularly when he had difficulty composing. Upon his death, one of Harpo's harps was donated to the State of Israel, and eventually found a home in an Israeli orchestra.

Chico found Harpo some of his first jobs. He and Chico were co-workers, playing piano to accompany silent films. Unlike Chico, Harpo could play only two songs on the piano, "Waltz Me Around Again, Willie" and "Love Me and the World Is Mine", but he adapted this small repertoire in different tempos to suit the action on the screen. He was also seen playing a portion of Rachmaninoff's "Prelude in C# minor" in A Day at the Races, and played piano in A Night at the Opera. Ultimately, he relinquished the piano to Chico in favor of his trademark harp, upon which he performed Nacio Herb Brown's 1935 song "Alone", which was sung in the film by Kitty Carlisle and Allan Jones.

Harpo had changed his name from "Adolph", a name he disliked (as a child, he was routinely called "Ahdie" instead),  to "Arthur" by 1911. The similarity to the name of prominent Chicago show business attorney Adolph Marks may have further encouraged the change. Urban legends stating that the name change came about during World War I due to anti-German sentiment in the US, or during World War II because of the stigma that Adolf Hitler imposed on the name, are groundless.

On film 
His first screen appearance was in the film Humor Risk (1921), with his brothers, although according to Groucho it was screened only once and then lost. Four years later, Harpo appeared without his brothers as the "Village Peter Pan" in Too Many Kisses which predated the brothers' first collaborative film, The Cocoanuts, by 4 years. Not only is The Cocoanuts historical by virtue of being the first of the Marx's many talkies, but also for being the first film to feature an overhead camera shot, at least 5 years before Busby Berkeley's renowned first use of the technique in his 1936 film Lullaby of Broadway to film a kaleidoscopic women's dance routine. In Too Many Kisses, Harpo spoke the only line he would ever speak on-camera in a film: "You sure you can't move?" (said to the film's tied-up hero before punching him). Fittingly, it was a silent film, and the audience saw only his lips move and the line on a title card.

Harpo was often cast as Chico's eccentric partner-in-crime, whom he would often help by playing charades to tell of Groucho's problem, and/or annoy by giving Chico his leg, as an alternative to a handshake or simply to rest the leg.

Harpo became known for prop-laden sight gags, in particular the seemingly infinite number of odd things stored in his topcoat's oversized pockets. In the film Horse Feathers (1932), Groucho, referring to an impossible situation, tells Harpo that he cannot "burn the candle at both ends". Harpo immediately produces from within his coat pocket a lit candle burning at both ends. In the same film, a homeless man on the street asks Harpo for money for a cup of coffee, and he subsequently produces a steaming cup, complete with saucer, from inside his coat. Also in Horse Feathers, he has a fish and a sword, and when he wants to go to his speakeasy, he stabs the fish in its mouth with his sword to give the password, "Swordfish". In Duck Soup, he produces a lit blowtorch to light a cigar.

Harpo often used facial expressions and mime to get his point across instead of speaking. One of his facial expressions, which he used in every Marx Brothers film and stage play, beginning with Fun in Hi Skule, was known as "the Gookie". Harpo created it by mimicking the expression of Mr. Gehrke, a New York tobacconist who would make a similar face while concentrating on rolling cigars.

Harpo further distinguished his character by wearing a "fright wig". Early in his career, it was dyed pink, as evidenced by color film posters of the time and by allusions to it in films, with character names such as "Pinky" in Duck Soup. This wig sometimes appeared blond on-screen due to the black-and-white film stock used at the time. In some films, however, Harpo actually wore a blonde wig. Over time, he darkened the pink to more of a reddish color, which films again alluded to with character names, such as the name of his character in A Night in Casablanca, "Rusty".

His non-speaking in his early films was occasionally referred to by the other Marx Brothers, who were careful to imply that his character's not speaking was a choice rather than a disability. In reality, the decision to remain silent began when Harpo received a negative review, part of which suggested that Harpo's portrayal of a fool was convincing only until he spoke. Soon after, the Brothers' uncle shared with Harpo a script he had written for them. Harpo was dismayed to find he had just three lines and said to his uncle, "Well, maybe I won't talk at all!" This was meant sarcastically, but his uncle genuinely liked the idea. His brothers would make joking reference to this part of his act. For example, in Animal Crackers, his character was ironically dubbed "The Professor". In The Cocoanuts, this exchange occurred:

Groucho: "Who is this?"

Chico: "Dat's-a my partner, but he no speak."

Groucho: "Oh, that's your silent partner!"

In later films, Harpo was repeatedly put in situations where he attempted to convey a vital message by whistling and pantomime, reinforcing the idea that his character was unable to speak.

The Marxes' film At the Circus (1939) contains a unique scene where Harpo is heard saying "A-choo!" twice, as he sneezes.

Tour in the Soviet Union 

In 1933, following U.S. diplomatic recognition of the Soviet Union, Harpo spent six weeks in Moscow as a performer and goodwill ambassador. His tour was a huge success, and the show ran for six weeks. Harpo's name was transliterated into Russian, using the Cyrillic alphabet, as "ХАРПО МАРКС," which is how he was billed during his Soviet Union appearances. Harpo, having no knowledge of Russian, pronounced it as "Exapno Mapcase". At that time, Harpo and the Soviet Foreign Minister Maxim Litvinov became friends and even performed a routine on stage together.

During this time he served as a secret courier, delivering communiques to and from the US embassy in Moscow at the request of Ambassador William Christian Bullitt Jr., smuggling the messages in and out of the Soviet Union by taping a sealed envelope to his leg beneath his trousers.  Marx recounted his relief at his voyage's end: "I pulled up my pants, ripped off the tape, unwound the straps, handed over the dispatches from Ambassador Bullitt, and gave my leg its first scratch in ten days."

Marx's Soviet trip helped inspire Randall Garrett's science fiction tale of telepathic spies, The Foreign Hand Tie. The novella contains numerous other Marx Brothers references as well. (The title itself is a Marx-like pun on the dual ideas of a "foreign hand" and a style of neckwear known as a "four-in-hand tie".)

In other media 
In 1936, he rode an ostrich on a team of polo-playing film stars who appeared as caricatures in the Walt Disney Production's Mickey's Polo Team, alongside Charlie Chaplin and Laurel and Hardy. Walt Disney would later feature Harpo (with Groucho and Chico) as one of King Cole's "Fiddlers Three" in the Silly Symphony Mother Goose Goes Hollywood.
Harpo was also caricatured in Fleischer Studios' Popeye cartoon Sock-A-Bye Baby (1934), in which Harpo's harp playing awakens Popeye's baby  resulting in Popeye punching Marx, apparently fatally (as suggested when Harpo develops a halo and ascends to the heavens). Friz Freleng's 1936 Merrie Melodies cartoon The Coo-Coo Nut Grove caricatured Harpo, one of multiple celebrities appearing as an animal, as a bird with a red beak who chases a "woman" who is later revealed to be Groucho.

Harpo also took an interest in painting. Some of his works can be seen in his autobiography, in which he recalls having tried to paint a nude female model, but that he had frozen up because he simply did not know how to paint properly. The model, pitying Marx, taught him some basic brush strokes. Eventually, the original project was abandoned in lieu of a painting, by the model herself, of a fully-clothed Harpo. Marx himself was the subject of a sketch by Salvador Dalí, who was Harpo's friend and authored Giraffes on Horseback Salad.

Harpo recorded an album of harp music for RCA Victor (Harp by Harpo, 1952) and two for Mercury Records (Harpo in Hi-Fi, 1957; Harpo at Work, 1958).

Harpo made television appearances through the 1950s and 60s, including a 1955 episode of I Love Lucy, in which he and Lucille Ball re-enacted the famous mirror scene from Duck Soup. Both Marx and Ball, clad in his typical clothes, portray Harpo. He also appeared on NBC's The Martha Raye Show circa 1950. Harpo and Chico appeared in the May 8, 1959 episode of General Electric Theater entitled "The Incredible Jewelry Robbery" entirely in pantomime. The episode concluded with a brief surprise appearance by Groucho. In 1960, Marx appeared in his first dramatic role, the A Silent Panic episode of The DuPont Show with June Allyson.  Harpo plays a deaf-mute who witnesses a gangland murder while working as a "mechanical man" in a department store window. In 1961, to publicize his autobiography Harpo Speaks!, he appeared on The Today Show, Play Your Hunch, Candid Camera, I've Got a Secret, Here's Hollywood, Art Linkletter's House Party, Groucho's You Bet Your Life, The Ed Sullivan Show.

In November 1961, he guest-starred with Carol Burnett in an installment of The DuPont Show of the Week entitled "The Wonderful World of Toys". The show was filmed in Central Park and featured Marx playing "Autumn Leaves" on the harp. Other stars appearing in the episode included Eva Gabor, Audrey Meadows, Mitch Miller and Milton Berle. A visit to the set inspired poet Robert Lowell to pen his poem Harpo Marx.

Late 1962 brought Harpo's final pair of television appearances, which aired within a month of each other. He portrayed a guardian angel on the September 25 episode of CBS's The Red Skelton Hour. His final role, opposite show star Fess Parker, was as himself on the October 20th episode Musicale of ABC's sitcom Mr. Smith Goes to Washington (based on Frank Capra's film of the same name) .

Personal life 

Harpo's September 28, 1936, marriage to actress Susan Fleming became public knowledge the next month due to a congratulatory telegram sent by President Franklin D. Roosevelt. Harpo's marriage, like Gummo's, was lifelong (Groucho was divorced three times, Zeppo twice, and Chico once). The couple adopted four children: Bill, Alex, Jimmy, and Minnie. When he was asked by George Burns in 1948 how many children he planned to adopt, he answered, "I’d like to adopt as many children as I have windows in my house. So when I leave for work, I want a kid in every window, waving goodbye."

Harpo was good friends with theater critic Alexander Woollcott, alongside whom he became a regular member of the Algonquin Round Table. He once said his main contribution was to be the audience for the quips of other members. In their play The Man Who Came to Dinner, George S. Kaufman and Moss Hart based the character of "Banjo" on Harpo. Harpo later played the role in Los Angeles opposite Woollcott, himself the inspiration for the character of Sheridan Whiteside.

In 1961, Harpo published his autobiography, Harpo Speaks!   Because he never spoke a word in character, many believed he actually was mute. In fact, radio and TV news recordings of his voice can be found on the Internet, in documentaries, and on bonus materials of Marx Brothers DVDs. A reporter who interviewed him in the early 1930s wrote that "he [Harpo] ... had a deep and distinguished voice, like a professional announcer", and like his brothers, spoke with a New York accent his entire life. According to those who personally knew him, Harpo's voice was much deeper than Groucho's, but it also sounded very similar to Chico's. His son, Bill, recalled that in private, Harpo had a very deep and mature soft-spoken voice, but that he was "not verbose" like the other Marx brothers, instead preferring to listen and learn from others.

Harpo's final public appearance came on January 19, 1963, when he announced his retirement, causing singer/comedian Allan Sherman to burst into tears.  Comedian Steve Allen, who was in the audience, remembered that Harpo spoke for several minutes about his career, and how he would miss it all, and repeatedly interrupted Sherman when he tried to speak. Allen remembered that although the audience found this rare speech from Harpo charmingly ironic, his personal opinion was that Harpo "wouldn't shut up!" Harpo, an avid croquet player, was inducted into the Croquet Hall of Fame in 1979.

Death 
Harpo Marx died on September 28, 1964 (his 28th wedding anniversary), at age 75 in a West Los Angeles hospital, one day after undergoing heart surgery. Harpo's death was said to have hit the surviving Marx brothers very hard. Groucho's son Arthur Marx, who attended the funeral with most of the Marx family, later said that Harpo's funeral was the only time in his life that he ever saw his father cry. In his will, Harpo Marx donated his trademark harp to the State of Israel, where it was later used in an Israeli orchestra. His remains were cremated at the Hollywood Forever Cemetery and a portion of his ashes were allegedly scattered in the sand trap at the 7th hole of a golf course in Rancho Mirage, California. He was survived by his wife Susan, four children Bill, Alex, Jimmy, and Minnie and younger brothers Groucho, Gummo and Zeppo,

Legacy 
Harpo's trademark outfit consisted of a trench coat with over-large pockets, red wig (he switched to a blond one for every film after The Cocoanuts because the red wig photographed dark in black-and-white), top hat, the comical horn heard in his movies, and his ever-present harp. In time, his talent earned him an international reputation as he performed in films as well as in stage shows around the globe. His talent extended to piano and clarinet (on which he played When My Dreams Come True in The Cocoanuts), which, as he had with the harp, Harpo mostly learned independent of professional instruction.  Marx's son Bill went on to display his own musical abilities, performing his own compositions on piano live in concert alongside harpist Carrol McLaughlin. In 2002, a Golden Palm Star on the Palm Springs, California, Walk of Stars, located at 190 E. Tahquitz Way, was dedicated to Harpo's memory.

Harpo was frequently invited to parties thrown by newspaper tycoon William Randolph Hearst.

Media portrayals 
Marx was portrayed by the actor J. M. Henry in the 1994 film Mrs. Parker and the Vicious Circle.

Marx was portrayed by actor Daniel Fortus in the Broadway production of Minnie's Boys, a Broadway musical that ran for 64 performances at the Imperial Theatre from March to May 1970. The show focused on the early days of the Marx Brothers' act and the importance of their mother Minnie's strong hand in guiding and molding them into a successful vaudeville and film comedy team.

Actress Priscilla Lopez played Gino, a character based on Harpo, in 1980's Broadway send-up of Hollywood filmmaking A Day in Hollywood/A Night in the Ukraine. This role earned Lopez a Tony Award for Best Performance by a Featured Actress in a Musical.

Les Marsden portrayed Harpo in Groucho: A Life in Revue, written by Groucho's son, Arthur Marx, and Robert Fisher.  The play, held at the off-Broadway Lucille Lortel Theatre, boasted a 264 show run from September 8, 1986, to May 3, 1987.

References in music

Filmography

Film

TV

Discography 
1952 Harp by Harpo
1957 Harpo in Hi-Fi
1958 Harpo at Work!

Bibliography 
1961 Harpo Speaks!
2000 Harpo Speaks ...About New York (the first two chapters of the above, repackaged)

Notes

References 
 Adamson, Joe (1973). Groucho, Harpo, Chico and Sometimes Zeppo: A Celebration of the Marx Brothers. New York: Simon & Schuster. 
 Marx, Harpo (1961). Harpo Speaks!. New York: B. Geis Associates; New York: Limelight Editions, 1985. 
 Mitchell, Glenn (1996). The Marx Brothers Encyclopedia. London: B.T. Batsford Ltd. 
 Koestenbaum, Wayne (2012). The Anatomy of Harpo Marx. Berkeley: University of California Press. 
 Fix, Charlene (2013) Harpo Marx asTrickster. Jefferson, North Carolina: McFarland Publishers Inc.

External links 

 Harpo Marx family website, run by his son Bill
 
 
 

1888 births
1964 deaths
20th-century American male actors
20th-century American comedians
American comedy musicians
American harpists
American male comedians
American male comedy actors
American male film actors
American male musical theatre actors
American male stage actors
American mimes
American people of French-Jewish descent
American people of German-Jewish descent
American Zionists
Comedians from New York City
Jewish American comedians
Jewish American male actors
Jewish mimes
Male actors from New York City
Marx Brothers
People from the Upper East Side
RCA Victor artists
Vaudeville performers
Whistlers
Algonquin Round Table